The Bread of Those Early Years is a 1955 novella by the West German writer Heinrich Böll. It concerns Walter Fendrich, a young man living alone in a post-war German city (probably based on Cologne), making ends meet as a washing machine repair man. The story takes place on a single March day in 1949 when Walter meets the daughter of a family friend, whom he is supposed to help settle into her student lodgings. So enraptured is he by Hedwig that he sees his whole life anew — the death of his mother, his relationship with his father, postwar privations and his negative experiences as an apprentice. 
Whether Walter can truly expect his epiphany to be life-transforming, however, is a question that will be in the reader's mind as the story unfolds.

The novella was adapted into a 1962 film with the same title.

German text
 Das Brot der frühen Jahre, Kiepenheuer & Witsch, 1955
 Das Brot der frühen Jahre, Heinemann, with an introduction by James Alldridge, 1965 (reprinted 1981)

English translations
 The Bread of those Early Years, translated by Leila Vennewitz, European Classics, 1994
 The Bread of those Early Years, translated and illustrated by Rachel A H Beckett, unpublished, 2019; this also has an Afterword containing a critical analysis of the novel

References

1955 German novels
Novels by Heinrich Böll
German-language novels
German novels adapted into films
Kiepenheuer & Witsch books